Whaley Bridge railway station serves the Peak District town of Whaley Bridge in Derbyshire, England.

Opened on 9 June 1857, the station was originally on the Stockport, Disley and Whaley Bridge Railway, built by the London and North Western Railway to connect with the Cromford and High Peak Railway and extended to Buxton in 1863. Until 1983, the station had an active signal box and served as a terminus for some trains to/from Manchester.

The station is unusual for the line in that its platform one, where the main station building and ticket office is sited, is on the side for trains bound for Buxton, whereas platform two serves trains to Manchester. The platform is on a tight curve and was some 30 cm too low for the height of the carriages used, making it difficult to access for people with mobility problems. The problem was addressed by Network Rail in 2012, who rebuilt the Buxton platform and installed an Easy Access ramp on the Manchester-bound side.

The station enjoys the support of the local community in the form of Friends of Whaley Bridge Station, a voluntary group dedicated to improving and maintaining the station buildings and grounds.

Facilities
The ticket office is staffed six days per week (Mondays to Saturdays) from early morning until early afternoon (06:50 - 13:25).  At other times, tickets must be purchased prior to travel or on the train.  There is a waiting room in the main building (open when the booking office is staffed) and canopies to offer a covered waiting area at all times; platform two has a waiting shelter. Train running information is provided via help points on each platform, digital CIS displays, timetable posters and automated announcements.

Service
On weekdays from 06:18 to 18:17, there are generally two trains an hour to Manchester Piccadilly. Thereafter, trains are hourly until 23:16.

On Sundays, there is one train an hour in each direction between 08:31 and 23:29.

References

External links

Photos of the station and Buxton Line in the early 1980s

Railway stations in Derbyshire
DfT Category E stations
Former London and North Western Railway stations
Railway stations in Great Britain opened in 1857
Northern franchise railway stations
1857 establishments in England
Whaley Bridge